Rubén Placánica (27 July 1943 – 14 September 2022) was an Argentine cyclist.

Biography
He competed in the individual road race and team time trial events at the 1964 Summer Olympics. 

Placánica died from COVID-19 on 14 September 2022, at the age of 79.

References

External links
 

1943 births
2022 deaths
Argentine male cyclists
Cyclists from Buenos Aires
Cyclists at the 1964 Summer Olympics
Olympic cyclists of Argentina
Deaths from the COVID-19 pandemic in Argentina